Dorothea Kent (born Dorothea Jane Schaeffer; June 6, 1916 – December 10, 1990) was an American film actress. She appeared in more than 40 films between 1935 and 1948. A former model, she often played dumb sidekicks of the heroine, and rarely played the lead. In addition to her credited roles, she also had roles in six other films, including her last role in the 1948 film The Babe Ruth Story. 

The daughter of Mr. and Mrs. Anthony Schaeffer, Kent was born Dorothea Jane Schaeffer in Missouri on June 6, 1916, and died in Burbank, California, on December 10, 1990, from cancer. She was buried at the San Fernando Mission Cemetery.

Partial filmography

 George White's Scandals (1934) - Dancer (uncredited)
 Horses' Collars (1935, Short) - Nell Higginbottom
 The Little Big Top (1935, Short)
 Hayseed Romance (1935, Short) - Molly
 Tars and Stripes (1935, Short) - Mack's Girlfriend
 It Never Rains (1935, Short)
 The E-Flat Man (1935, Short) - Elmer's Girl
 Knockout Drops (1935, Short)
 August Weekend (1936) - Midge Washburne (uncredited)
 The Luckiest Girl in the World (1936) - Mary
 Flying Hostess (1936) - Party Girl (uncredited)
 More Than a Secretary (1936) - Maizie West
 As Good as Married (1937) - Poochie
 Carnival Queen (1937) - Marion Prescott
 A Girl with Ideas (1937) - Isabelle Foster
 Some Blondes Are Dangerous (1937) - Rose Whitney
 Prescription for Romance (1937) - Lola Carroll
 Goodbye Broadway (1938) - Jeanne Carlyle
 Young Fugitives (1938) - Meg
 Having Wonderful Time (1938) - Maxine
 Youth Takes a Fling (1938) - Jean
 The Last Express (1938) - Amy Arden
 Strange Faces (1938) - Maggie Moore
 Risky Business (1939) - Mary Dexter
 She Married a Cop (1939) - Mabel Dunne
 Million Dollar Legs (1939) - Susie Quinn
 Danger Ahead (1940) - Genevieve
 Flight Angels (1940) - Mabel
 Cross-Country Romance (1940) - Millie
 They Drive by Night (1940) - Sue (uncredited)
 No, No, Nanette (1940) - Betty
 It Started with Eve (1941) - Jackie Donovan
 Call of the Canyon (1942) - Jane Oakley
 King of the Cowboys (1943) - Ruby Smith
 Stage Door Canteen (1943) - Mamie - Jersey's Girl
 Pin Up Girl (1944) - Kay
 Army Wives (1944) - Louise
 Carolina Blues (1944) - Maisie (uncredited)
 Bring On the Girls (1945) - Myrtle (uncredited)
 Ten Cents a Dance (1945) - Sadie (uncredited)
 The Missing Lady (1946) - Jennie Delaney
 Behind the Mask (1946) - Jennie Delaney
 It Happened on 5th Avenue (1947) - Margie Temple
 The Babe Ruth Story (1948) - Blonde (uncredited)

References

External links

 
 

1916 births
1990 deaths
20th-century American actresses
Actresses from Missouri
American film actresses
Deaths from breast cancer
Deaths from cancer in California
Burials at San Fernando Mission Cemetery
Actors from St. Joseph, Missouri